The men's 200 metre backstroke event at the 1968 Summer Olympics took place on 25 October at the Alberca Olímpica Francisco Márquez. There were 30 competitors from 21 nations, with each nation having up to three swimmers. The event was won by Roland Matthes of East Germany, the second gold medal for a German swimmer after Ernst Hoppenberg won in 1900. Matthes completed the backstroke double (100 and 200 metres) in the first Games both events were held, with Olympic record times in both. The United States, which had swept the podium in 1964, finished in the next three places behind Matthes: Mitch Ivey took silver, Jack Horsley bronze, and Gary Hall Sr. 4th.

Background

This was the third appearance of the 200 metre backstroke event. It was first held in 1900. The event did not return until 1964; since then, it has been on the programme at every Summer Games. From 1904 to 1960, a men's 100 metre backstroke was held instead. In 1964, only the 200 metres was held. Beginning in 1968 and ever since, both the 100 and 200 metre versions have been held.

None of the 8 finalists from the 1964 Games returned. Roland Matthes had set the world record in the East German Olympic trials. The American team was also strong, though all three members of the 1964 podium sweeping team had been replaced.

The Republic of China, Cuba, Guatemala, Mexico, the Philippines, and Switzerland made their debut in the event; East and West Germany competed separately for the first time. Italy and the Netherlands each made their third appearance, the only two nations to have competed at each appearance of the event to that point.

Competition format

The competition used a two-round (heats and final) format. The advancement rule followed the format introduced in 1952. A swimmer's place in the heat was not used to determine advancement; instead, the fastest times from across all heats in a round were used. There were 5 heats of up to 8 swimmers each; with numerous withdrawals, one heat had only 3 swimmers. The top 8 swimmers advanced to the final. Swim-offs were used as necessary to break ties.

This swimming event used backstroke. Because an Olympic-size swimming pool is 50 metres long, this race consisted of four lengths of the pool.

Records

These were the standing world and Olympic records (in seconds) prior to the 1964 Summer Olympics.

Roland Matthes broke the Olympic record with a time of 2:09.6 in the final.

Schedule

All times are Central Standard Time (UTC-6)

Results

Heats

Final

References

Men's backstroke 200 metre
200 metre backstroke at the Olympics
Men's events at the 1968 Summer Olympics